Juliusz Letniowski (born 8 April 1998) is a Polish professional footballer who plays as a midfielder for Ekstraklasa side Widzew Łódź.

Club career

In 2016, Letniowski was sent on loan from Lechia Gdańsk to Bytovia Bytów.

On 27 July 2020, he joined Arka Gdynia on loan.

Having spent the 2021–22 season on loan at Widzew Łódź, he joined the club on a permanent basis on 30 June 2022, signing a two-year contract with an extension option.

Career statistics

References

External links

1998 births
Sportspeople from Gdańsk
Living people
Polish footballers
Poland youth international footballers
Association football midfielders
Lechia Gdańsk II players
Lechia Gdańsk players
Bałtyk Gdynia players
Bytovia Bytów players
Lech Poznań players
Lech Poznań II players
Arka Gdynia players
Widzew Łódź players
Ekstraklasa players
I liga players
II liga players
III liga players